Home is a 2008 Swiss drama film directed by Ursula Meier, starring Isabelle Huppert and Olivier Gourmet. The film was the official Swiss submission for Best Foreign Language Film at the 82nd Academy Awards, but was not nominated.

Plot
Marthe (Isabelle Huppert) and Michel (Olivier Gourmet) live with their three children in a house next to an uncompleted highway. They use the deserted road as a recreation area. For example, they put an inflatable swimming pool on it and the son and his friends use the highway to ride their bicycles. As it has been ten years since the highway was abandoned, they believe that it will not be completed. One day, without warning, construction workers begin to upgrade the road and the highway opens to traffic. Despite noise from passing traffic, the family remains in the house. Previously, the father would simply walk across the highway in order to access his car to get to work. This becomes harder as the highway becomes busier. He and his children eventually have to use a tunnel in order to access the outside world.

Their younger daughter, Marion (Madeleine Budd), becomes obsessed about the quality and cleanliness of her surroundings. She monitors the grass as it exhibits the effects of carbon monoxide emissions and is convinced that the family may fall ill or even die prematurely, as a consequence of living in such close proximity to the highway. The elder daughter, Judith (Adélaïde Leroux), continues to sunbathe on the front lawn, despite attracting unwanted attention from passing motorists.

One day, Judith decides to leave home without telling her family. Returning after a period of time, being driven by a man, she finds the house bricked-up and, after an unsuccessful attempt to find an entrance, leaves again. In her absence, Michel had attempted to leave with the remaining children, but Marthe refused to depart. The family then decided to sound-proof the house, which included blocking up all the windows and sealing all the ventilation points. Confined, the pressure begins to take its toll and, in what appears to be a death dream, Marthe breaks open a wall and the family exits the house into the sunlit outdoors.

Cast
 Isabelle Huppert as Marthe
 Olivier Gourmet as Michel
 Adélaïde Leroux as Judith
 Madeleine Budd as Marion
 Kacey Mottet Klein as Julien

Production
Director Ursula Meier searched for a suitable location across Europe, before finding a spot in Bulgaria. The road itself was already under construction and they then built the house next to the then-unused road. Meier wrote the script specifically for Isabelle Huppert before she was cast. Huppert was given the script while she was in Belgium, working on Joachim Lafosse's film Private Property.

Reception
Metacritic, which assigns a normalized rating out of 100 to reviews from mainstream critics, reported an average score of 67, based on 12 reviews, indicating "generally favorable reviews".

Accolades

See also
 Isabelle Huppert on screen and stage

References

External links
 

2008 films
2008 drama films
Swiss drama films
French drama films
2000s French-language films
Films directed by Ursula Meier
Films shot in Bulgaria
French-language Swiss films
2000s French films